National Liberation Front (in Spanish: Frente de Liberación Nacional) was a political party in Peru founded in 1960 by General César Pando Egúsquiza, Salomón Bolo Hidalgo, and Genaro Checa. It participated in the 1962 elections.

Political parties established in 1960
Defunct political parties in Peru